The women's foil was one of eight fencing events on the fencing at the 1984 Summer Olympics programme. It was the twelfth appearance of the event. The competition was held from 2 to 3 August 1984. 42 fencers from 18 nations competed.

Competition format

The 1984 tournament used a three-phase format similar to that of 1976 and 1980, though the final phase was different.

The first phase was a multi-round round-robin pool play format; each fencer in a pool faced each other fencer in that pool once. There were three pool rounds: 
 The first round had 6 pools of 7 fencers each, with the top 5 in each pool advancing.
 The second round had 6 pools of 5 fencers each, with the top 4 in each pool advancing.
 The third round had 4 pools of 6 fencers each, with the top 4 in each pool advancing.

The second phase was a truncated double-elimination tournament. Four fencers advanced to the final round through the winners brackets and four more advanced via the repechage.

The final phase was a single elimination tournament with a bronze medal match. (This was changed from a 6-woman final round-robin pool in previous years.)

Bouts in the round-robin pools were to 5 touches; bouts in the double-elimination and final rounds were to 8 touches.

Results

Round 1

Round 1 Pool A

Round 1 Pool B

Round 1 Pool C 

A barrage was necessary because Bradford and Sinigaglia finished with identical win–loss records, touches against, and touches for. Sinigaglia had won the round-robin bout between the two, but Bradford prevailed 5–0 in the barrage to advance to the second round.

 Barrage

Round 1 Pool D

Round 1 Pool E

Round 1 Pool F

Round 2

Round 2 Pool A

Round 2 Pool B

Round 2 Pool C

Round 2 Pool D

Round 2 Pool E

Round 2 Pool F

Round 3

Round 3 Pool A

Round 3 Pool B

Round 3 Pool C

Round 3 Pool D

Double elimination rounds

Winners brackets

Winners group 1

Winners group 2

Winners group 3

Winners group 4

Losers brackets

Losers group 1

Losers group 2

Losers group 3

Losers group 4

Final round

Final classification

References

Foil women
1984 in women's fencing
Fen